The Kukatj are an Aboriginal Australian people of the Cape York Peninsula in the state of Queensland. They are to be distinguished from the Kukatja of Western Australia and the Luritja of the Northern Territory, who have also historically been known as Kukatja.

Country
Their eastward extension, from Inverleigh reached the Flinders River, and running northwards from the area of the Donor Hills up to the Gulf of Carpentaria.

Frontier wars
When European settlers moved into the Gulf of Carpentaria region and established Normanton in the 1870s, there were an estimated seven Aboriginal peoples in the area, and the frontier wars blurred and confused the boundaries of traditional lands. By the 1920s, many Aboriginal people had been forcibly removed to Aboriginal reserves and missions. The Gkuthaarn and Kukatj people who remained lived in camps along the south-western side of the town, while others, such as the Kurtijar people, camped north of the Norman River.

Native title

Their recognition as traditional owners of the land, eight years after lodging the claim, allows the two groups to hunt, hunt  and practise their culture and their cultural ceremonies on pastoral land.

Language

The Kukatj people spoke the Kukatj language, which is now extinct.

Alternative names
 Kukatji
 Gugadji
 Konggada (language name)

Indigenous rangers
The Gkuthaarn Kukatj Indigenous Land & Sea Ranger group is a group of Indigenous rangers made up of Kukatj and Gkuthaarn people, help to protect the natural resources and cultural heritage of the southern Gulf of Carpentaria region. The group is managed by the Carpentaria Land Council Aboriginal Corporation (CLCAC).

References

Sources

Aboriginal peoples of Queensland
Far North Queensland